Lee Jung-jin, (born May 25, 1978) is a South Korean actor.

Early life
Lee Jung-jin graduated from Konkuk University with a degree in horticulture before studying acting at Hanyang University.

Career
Lee worked as a fashion model before being discovered by Jeong Young-beom, the CEO of talent agency Star J Entertainment. He made his acting debut in the 1998 sitcom Soonpoong Clinic, and has since appeared in many television dramas, including Two Outs in the Ninth Inning, Love Story in Harvard, The Fugitive: Plan B, and A Hundred Year Legacy.

He also starred in the films Once Upon a Time in High School, Mapado, Troubleshooter, Eun-ha, and most notably Pietà, for which he received the prestigious Okgwan Order of Cultural Merit.

From 2009 to 2011, Lee was a cast member of the popular variety show segment Qualifications of Men on KBS2's Happy Sunday.

In 2020, Lee Jung-jin played a character of Lee Lim, the illegitimate brother of King Lee Ho and half-uncle of Lee Gon (Lee Min-ho) in SBS TV multi-starrer The King: Eternal Monarch.

Personal life
Lee began his mandatory military service on February 28, 2005, where he worked as a member of the public staff at the Gwangjin District office.

Lee is an ambassador for South Korean international humanitarian and development organization, Good Neighbors.

In January 2018, Lee's agency confirmed he had been dating former member of Nine Muses'  since June 2017. The couple split in 2019.

Filmography

Film

Television series

Variety show

Awards and nominations

References

External links 

 
 
 

1978 births
Living people
People from Seoul
21st-century South Korean male actors
JYP Entertainment artists
Konkuk University alumni
Male actors from Seoul
South Korean male film actors
South Korean male models
South Korean male television actors